The necropolis of Su Crucifissu Mannu is an archaeological site located in the municipality of Porto Torres, Sardinia. 

The necropolis includes at least twenty-two domus de janas, all made in the period  between the Neolithic (IV millennium BC ) and the Copper Age (III millennium BC) and intensely used until the time of Bonnanaro culture (1800–1600 BC).

Some internal chambers are decorated with symbolic elements (stylized bull's horns) and architectural elements (steps, contoured doors, lintels) typical of the period, carved in relief in the rock.

References

Bibliography
 Maria Luisa Ferrarese Ceruti, La tomba XVI di Su Crucifissu Mannu e la Cultura di Bonnanaro, in Bullettino di Paletnologia Italiana, nuova serie, XXIII, vol. 81, 1972–1974, Roma 1976, pp. 113–210
 Maria Luisa Ferrarese Ceruti, Le necropoli di Su Crucifissu Mannu-Porto Torres e Ponte Secco-Sassari, in La Cultura di Ozieri. Problematiche e nuove acquisizioni, Ozieri, 1989, pp. 37–47
 Giovanni Maria Demartis, Tomba V di Montalè – Sassari. Necropoli di Su Crucifissu Mannu- Porto torres, Collana Il triangolo della Nurra, 2–4, Viterbo, 1998, Betagamma editrice

Archaeological sites in Sardinia